In Indian cuisine, dal (also spelled daal or dhal; pronunciation: , Hindi: दाल,) are dried, split pulses (e.g., lentils, peas, and beans) that do not require soaking before cooking. India is the largest producer of pulses in the world. The term is also used for various soups prepared from these pulses. These pulses are among the most important staple foods in South Asian countries, and form an important part of the cuisines of the Indian subcontinent.

Use 

The most common way of preparing dal is in the form of a soup to which onions, tomatoes and various spices may be added. 
The outer hull may or may not be stripped off. Almost all types of dal come in three forms: (1) unhulled or sabut (meaning whole in Hindi), e.g., sabut urad dal or mung sabut; (2) split with hull left on the split halves is described as chilka (which means shell in Hindi), e.g. chilka urad dal, mung dal chilka; (3) split and hulled or dhuli (meaning washed), e.g., urad dhuli or mung dhuli in Hindi.

Dal is frequently eaten with flatbreads  such as rotis or chapatis, or with rice. The latter combination is called dal bhat  in Nepali, Bengali and Marathi. In addition, certain types of dal are fried and salted and eaten as a dry snack, and a variety of savory snacks are made by frying a paste made from soaked and ground dals in different combinations, to which other ingredients such as spices and nuts (commonly cashews) may be added.

Etymology
The word dāl (dal) derives from the Sanskrit verbal root dal- "to split", which is inherited from Proto-Indo-European *delh₁- “to split, divide”.

Use by region 
Dal preparations are eaten with rice, chapati and naan on the Indian subcontinent. The manner in which it is cooked and presented varies by region. In South India, dal is often called "paruppu". It is primarily used to make the dish called sambar. It is also used to make paruppu that is mixed with charu and rice.

Nutrition

Cooked (boiled) dal contains 9% protein, 70% water, 20% carbohydrates (includes 8% fiber), and 1% fat. It also supplies a rich content (20% or more of the Daily Value, DV) of the B vitamin, folate (45% DV) and manganese (25% DV), with moderate amounts of thiamine (11% DV) and several dietary minerals, such as iron (19% DV) and phosphorus (18% DV).

Note: All nutrient values including protein are in %DV per 100 grams of the food item. Significant values are highlighted in light gray color and bold letters.
Cooking reduction = % Maximum typical reduction in nutrients due to boiling without draining for ovo-lacto-vegetables group.

Common ingredients

Pigeon pea, i.e., yellow pigeon peas, is available either plain or oily. It is called toor dal in Hindi. It is called thuvaram paruppu in Tamil Nadu, thuvara parippu in Kerala and is the main ingredient for the dish sambar. In Karnataka it is called togari bele and is an important ingredient in bisi bele bath. It is called kandi pappu in Telugu and is used in the preparation of a staple dish pappu charu. It is also known as arhar dal in northern India.
Chana dal is produced by removing the outer layer of black chickpeas and then splitting the kernel. Although machines can do this, it can be done at home by soaking the whole chickpeas and removing the loose skins by rubbing.  In Karnataka it is called . Other varieties of chickpea may be used, e.g., kabuli dal.

Yellow split peas are very prevalent in the Indian communities of Guyana, Fiji, Suriname, Jamaica, South Africa, Mauritius, Trinidad and Tobago, and are popular amongst Indians in the United States as well as India. There, it is referred to generically as dal and is the most popular dal. It is prepared similarly to dals found in India, but may be used in recipes. The whole dried pea is called matar or matar dal in India. The whole dried yellow pea is the main ingredient in the common Bengali street food ghugni.
Split mung beans (mung dal) is by far the most popular in Bangladesh and West Bengal (moog dal, (মুগ ডাল)). It is used in parts of South India, such as in the Tamil dish ven pongal. Roasted and lightly salted or spiced mung bean is a popular snack in most parts of India.
Urad dal, sometimes referred to as "black gram", is a primary ingredient of the south Indian dishes idli and dosa. It is one of the main ingredients of East Indian (Odia and Bengali or Assamese) bori, sun-dried dumplings. It is called  in Karnataka,  in Bengali. It is rich in protein.
 Masoor dal: split red lentils. In Karnataka, it is called kempu (red) togari bele.
Rajma dal: split kidney beans.
 Mussyang is from dals of various colours found in various hilly regions of Nepal.
 Panchratna dal (Hindi) ("five jewels") is a mixture of five varieties of dal, which produces a dish with unique flavour.
 Moth Bean: is an Indian dal main ingredient for popular Indian snack bikaneri bhujia and Maharashtrian snacks misal and usal.
 Pulses may be split but not hulled; they are distinguished from hulled dals by adding the word chilka (skin).

Split and whole pulses

Although dal generally refers to split pulses, whole pulses can be referred to as sabut dhal and split pulses as dhuli dhal. The hulling of a pulse is intended to improve digestibility and palatability, but, as milling of whole grains into refined grains, affects the nutrition provided by the dish, reducing dietary fibre content. Pulses with their outer hulls intact are also quite popular in the Indian subcontinent as the main cuisine. Over 50 different varieties of pulses are known in the Indian subcontinent.

Preparation

Most dal recipes are quite simple to prepare. The standard preparation begins with boiling a variety of dal (or a mix) in water with some turmeric, salt to taste, and then adding a fried garnish at the end of the cooking process. In some recipes, tomatoes, kokum, unripe mango, jaggery, or other ingredients are added while cooking the dal, often to impart a sweet-sour flavour.

The fried garnish for dal goes by many names, including chaunk, tadka/tarka, bagar, fodni, and phoran. The ingredients in the chaunk for each variety of dal vary by region and individual tastes. The raw spices (more commonly cumin seeds, mustard seeds, asafoetida, and sometimes fenugreek seeds and dried red chili pepper) are first fried for a few seconds in the hot oil on medium/low heat. This is generally followed by ginger, garlic, and onion, which are generally fried for 10 minutes. After the onion turns golden brown, ground spices (turmeric, coriander, red chili powder, garam masala, etc.) are added. The chaunk is then poured over the cooked dal.

See also

Dal bhat
 Dal bati churma
 Dal biji
 Ezogelin soup
 Fasole bătută
 Lentil soup
 Monggo (Philippine version of dal)
 Pea soup

References

Further reading 
 

Andhra cuisine
Bangladeshi soups and stews
Bengali cuisine
Bihari cuisine
Indian soups and stews
Indo-Caribbean cuisine
Legume dishes
Lentil dishes
Muhajir cuisine
Nepalese cuisine
Pakistani soups and stews
Plant common names
Punjabi cuisine
Rajasthani cuisine
Uttar Pradeshi cuisine
Sri Lankan legume dishes
Gujarati cuisine
Kutchi cuisine
Indian cuisine
Pakistani cuisine
Fijian cuisine